The Krummlauf  (English: "curved barrel") is a bent barrel attachment for the Sturmgewehr 44 (StG 44) rifle developed by Germany in World War II. The curved barrel included a periscope sighting device for shooting around corners from a safe position.

Description
It was produced in several variants: an "I" version for infantry use, a "P" version for use in tanks (to cover the dead areas in the close range around the tank and defend against assaulting infantry), versions with 30°, 45°, 60° and 90° bends, a version for the StG 44 and one for the MG 42. Only the 30° "I" version for the StG 44 was produced in many numbers.

The bent barrel attachments had very short lifespans—approximately 300 rounds for the 30° version, and 160 rounds for the 45° variant—as the barrel and bullets fired were put under great stress. Another problem besides the short life-span was that the bending caused the bullets to shatter and exit the barrel in multiple fragments, producing an unintended shotgun effect. As a result, weapons designers experimented with small vent holes drilled into the Krummlaufs barrel in order to reduce pressure and recoil, allowing the discharged bullets' built-up gases to be released to slow the bullet's velocity as it turned to exit the barrel. Nevertheless, the Krummlaufs lifespan remained the same.  A triangular shield was also added to prevent venting gasses from clouding the mirror and optics.

The 30° model was able to achieve a 35x35 cm grouping at 100m.

The Krummlauf in a Maschinenpistole Vorsatz (P) mount was developed as an alternative close defence weapon for tank destroyers. This mount was fitted to a roof hatch in many Panzer IV/70 (A) vehicles. The tank crew could then attach a StG 44 and use this as a close defence machine gun.

Derivatives
Experiments to adapt the Krummlauf to the PPSh-41 were conducted by the Soviet Union.

See also
 CornerShot
 Periscope rifle

References

External links
 http://www.lexikon-der-wehrmacht.de/Waffen/Bilderseitenneu/Krummlauf.htm 

Research and development in Nazi Germany
World War II infantry weapons of Germany